Camco Financial Corporation, or Camco Financial, headquartered in Cambridge, Ohio, was a registered bank holding company under the law of Delaware. It wholly owned the Ohio-based Advantage Bank and operated 22 offices in Ohio, Kentucky and West Virginia. Camco offered a wide range of banking services through Advantage Bank. As of December 31, 2012, Camco had $764.259 million in total assets, $59.727 million in total stockholders' equity and $627.224 million in deposits.

Camco ended in 2014, following a merger with Huntington Bancshares.

History
On October 19, 1970, Camco Financial Corporation was organized as a holding company.

In June, 2001, Camco Financial Corporation finished the reorganization and it combined the banking activities under the Advantage Bank.

In 2004 Camco Financial Corporation merged with London Financial Corporation of London, Ohio, along with its wholly owned subsidiary, The Citizens Bank of London.

In 2013, the corporation declared the termination of a Consent Order dating back to February 9, 2012, issued by the Federal Deposit Insurance Corporation (FDIC) and the State of Ohio's Department of Commerce, Division of Financial Institutions (Ohio Division).

In 2013, Camco was purchased by Huntington Bancshares. The merger was complete by March 2014, ending Camco Financial's independent existence.

References

External links

Companies formerly listed on the Nasdaq
Financial services companies of the United States
Holding companies of the United States
Holding companies established in 1970
Holding companies disestablished in 2014
1970 establishments in Ohio
2014 disestablishments in Ohio
Huntington Bancshares
American companies disestablished in 2014
American companies established in 1970
Financial services companies established in 1970